The Malaysian woolly horseshoe bat or Jester's horseshoe bat (Rhinolophus morio) is a bat species of the family Rhinolophidae. It is found in the Malay Peninsula and northern Sumatra.

References

Rhinolophidae
Mammals described in 1842
Taxa named by John Edward Gray
Bats of Southeast Asia